Hasbullah is a given name or surname and may refer to:

People

Footballers
 Hasbullah Awang (footballer) (born 1983), Malaysian footballer
 Tengku Hasbullah (born 1983), Malaysian footballer
 Hasbullah Abu Bakar (born 1994), Malaysian footballer
 Wasyiat Hasbullah (born 1994), Indonesian footballer

Others
 Hasbullah Awang (1952–2015), Malaysian sports commentator
 Hasbullah Osman (1957–2020), Malaysian politician
 Abdul Wahab Hasbullah (1889–1971), one of the founders of the Indonesian Nahdlatul Ulama movement
 S. H. Hasbullah (1950–2018), Sri Lankan social activist, geographer and academic
 Elfa Secioria (1959–2011), Indonesian composer and songwriter who was born Elfa Secioria Hasbullah
 Hasbulla Magomedov (born 2002), Russian social media personality